, also known by his Chinese style name , was a politician and bureaucrat of Ryukyu Kingdom.

Chōshō was born to an aristocrat family called Shō-uji Urasoe Dunchi. He was the 14th head of Urasoe Dunchi, and his father Kuniyoshi Chōshō (also known as Shō Ryōhitsu ), was a Sanshikan during Shō Iku's reign.

Chōshō was selected as a member of the Sanshikan in 1872. In 1876, Ryukyu had to break off diplomatic relations with Qing China under pressure from Imperial Japan. Chōshō sent Kōchi Chōjō, Rin Seikō and Sai Taitei to China to seek help.

In 1879, the Meiji government decided to abolish the Ryukyu Domain, and sent Matsuda Michiyuki to Shuri. Chōshō met Michiyuki and tried to prevent it but failed. Ryukyu was annexed by Japan and it was later organized as Okinawa Prefecture. Two of the last three Sanshikan returned to Okinawa, and Urasoe Chōshō and Tomikawa Seikei were appointed advisers of Okinawa Prefecture, but both of them wanted to restore the Ryukyu Domain. Chōshō stayed in Shuri, while Seikei fled to Fuzhou. All of them struggled for this ideal until their deaths.

Chōshō was good at waka and Han learning.

References
浦添朝昭∥ウラゾエ　チョウショウ
廃藩当時の人物

1825 births
1883 deaths
People of the Ryukyu Kingdom
Ryukyuan people
19th-century Ryukyuan people
Ueekata
Sanshikan